Tasma Walton (born 19 August 1973) is an Australian television and film actress.

Acting career
Walton joined local radio station 6GE and trained as a production assistant and copy writer in her home town. She was accepted into the National Institute of Dramatic Art (NIDA) but dropped out after two years. She joined a small Sydney theatre, and landed a role as the love interest of Ian Moss in the music video for Tucker's Daughter off his 1989 debut album Matchbook. In 1995, Walton played the recurring role of Rachel Watson in Home and Away.

In 1996, Walton was cast as Dash McKinley in the police drama series Blue Heelers. Her character was introduced halfway through Season 3. She also played another character, Kim Trelor, in the same series. To win the role of Dash, Walton auditioned three times. Her second one with William McInnes (Nick Schultz) gained her the role. In the audition Schultz yelled at Dash and while some of the other actresses burst into tears, Walton reacted by laughing. In the same year she made her film debut in Fistful of Flies. Her last episode of Blue Heelers, "The Full Circle" screened in mid-1999. Walton stated that she was leaving the series to pursue other acting projects and to be with her boyfriend in Sydney.

She has since appeared in a variety of film and TV productions, including Water Rats, Sea Patrol, The Postcard Bandit and Perdition.  She also won recurring roles in White Collar Blue and BeastMaster.

In 2009, Walton joined the cast of City Homicide in the semi-regular role of criminal profiler, Claudia Leigh. On 27 July 2013, it was announced that Walton had rejoined the cast of Home and Away in the recurring role of Jade Montgomery. She was on the show for two seasons.

In 2016, Walton appeared on three episodes of Rake. She also had a regular role on Cleverman (in 2016 and 2017). In 2018, she joined the cast of Mystery Road, reprising her role from the 2013 film of the same name. She returned to season two in 2020.

Personal life
Walton has Aboriginal heritage on her mother's side.  Walton was in a relationship with Danny Roberts for seven and a half years until 2004. She began dating Rove McManus in October 2007. They married in a private ceremony in Broome, Western Australia on 16 June 2009. In September 2013, Walton and McManus announced that they were expecting their first child. The couple's daughter was born in December 2013.

Filmography

Film

Television

Theatre 
 New Theatre (Sydney)

Books 
 Heartless (Fiction) (Pub Date 28 September 2009)

Awards 
 At the 39th Annual TV Week Logie Awards held in 1997, Walton won the Logie for the "Most Popular New Talent" for her role as "Constable Dash McKinley" on Blue Heelers.
Walton was nominated for Best Actress at the 3rd AACTA Awards for her role in Mystery Road, but lost against Rose Byrne for The Turning.

References

External links

1973 births
Actresses from Western Australia
Australian film actresses
Australian television actresses
Living people
Logie Award winners
People from Geraldton
20th-century Australian actresses
21st-century Australian actresses